The 2022 Liga 3 West Nusa Tenggara or 2022 Bank NTB Syariah Liga 3 for sponsor reasons, is the fifth season of Liga 3 West Nusa Tenggara organized by Asprov PSSI NTB.

Followed by 26 clubs. The winner of this competition will advance to the national round without the regional round Lesser Sunda Islands representing West Nusa Tenggara Province for promotion to Liga 2.

Perslobar West Lombok is the defending champion after winning it in the 2021 season.

Teams 
2022 Liga 3 West Nusa Tenggara was attended by 26 teams from regencies and cities in West Nusa Tenggara who registered with the Asprov PSSI NTB.

Team name changes 
PS West Sumbawa renamed PS Cordova University.

Venues 
GOR 17 Desember Stadium, Mataram City
Pragas Stadium, Sumbawa Regency
Gelora Bou Lanta Stadium, Bima Regency

First round

Group A

Group B

Group C

Group D

Second round

Group E

Group F

Knockout stage

References

Liga 3
Sport in West Nusa Tenggara